Walton High School is a large mixed secondary school and sixth form serving a community in the southern part of Stafford, England.

There are approximately 1316 students on roll. The headteacher is Mr D. Foskett. The school catchment area is  around the school. The school's sixth form provision used to form part of the Stafford Collegiate which included all Stafford secondary schools and Stafford College, but this is no longer the case.

Previously a community school administered by Staffordshire County Council, in September 2016 Walton High School converted to academy status. The school is now the lead school in the Walton Multi-Academy Trust.

Controversy
In 2003 an illegal spy camera was placed by staff. Permission was not obtained for this camera, and its installation contravened child safety guidelines. It was said that it was installed to prevent weekend thefts. However, this camera was discovered on a Wednesday and therefore was still in place during weekdays. It was discovered by contractors repairing an extractor fan, who informed the head and the relevant authorities.

Notable former pupils
 Dave Gorman, comedian, author, and television presenter
 Julia Hills, actress
 Jonathan Ive, designer of the iMac, iPod, iPhone, and iPad, among others
 Hayden Norris, U-23 European champion and commonwealth games track cyclist

References

External links
Walton High Official Site

Academies in Staffordshire
Schools in Stafford
Secondary schools in Staffordshire